The five most common Cantonese profanities, vulgar words in the Cantonese language are diu (/), gau (//), lan (/), tsat (//) and hai (/), where the first ("diu") literally means fuck, "hai" is a word for female genitalia and "gau" refers to male genitalia. They are sometimes collectively known as the "outstanding five in Cantonese". These five words are generally offensive and give rise to a variety of euphemisms and minced oaths. Similar to the seven dirty words in the United States, these five words are forbidden to say and are bleep-censored on Hong Kong broadcast television. Other curse phrases, such as puk gai (/) and ham gaa caan (/), are also common.

Vulgar words

Diu

In a manner similar to the English word fuck, diu expresses dismay, disgrace and disapproval. Examples of expressions include diu nei!

The word diu was originally a noun meaning the penis and evolved as a verb. Regarded as a grossly vulgar word in Cantonese, the word has gained a new meaning in Taiwan to refer to "cool". In this context, the Mandarin pronunciation may not be censored on TV broadcasts but the original Cantonese pronunciation is still taboo.

Certain euphemisms exist, including siu (small/little), tsiu, yiu.

Gau

The phrase  ngong6 gau1 is an adjective that may be loosely translated as a "dumbass". Minced variants include  ngong6 geoi1,  ngong6 kiu1,  ngaang6 gaau1 (lit. hard plastic) and "on9" (used in internet slang). The phrase mou4 lei4 tau4 gau1 meaning "makes no sense" was cut to mou4 lei4 tau4 to avoid the sound gau1. Similar to "fucking" in English, this word is usually used as an adverb. Compare this:
 (crazy) 
 (fucking crazy)

Two common euphemisms gau, which only differ in the tone, include  gau2 (nine) and  gau2 (dog, but it may change the original "dumbass" meaning into "cunning" instead).

Lan
Similar to gau, this word is also usually used as an adverb.

lan yeung ( or ) can be loosely translated as "dickface".

Euphemisms includes  laan (lazy) or  nang (able to).

Tsat
Ban6 cat6
(stupid dick) is a more common phrase among others. However, it is usually used as a vulgar adjective especially among the youth. It means "ugly" or "shameful".

A common euphemism is  cat1 (seven), which only differs in the tone. Other euphemisms include  caat3 (to brush) and  caak6 (thieves). As a result, thieves that are easily caught by the police are often intentionally described as  ban6 caak6 (stupid thieves) in the newspaper to achieve the humorous effects from the phrase ban6 cat6.

Hai
The English equivalent is "cunt".  is more common on the mainland of China, with  being used in Hong Kong and Macao. The Chinese character  consists of two parts: the upper part is  that means "body" while the bottom part  means "a hole". The Chinese character thus literally means a "hole at the bottom of the body". Two common phrases include  so4 hai1 (silly cunt) and  cau3 hai1 (stinking cunt). Also another phrase is  diu2 hai1 (fuck a pussy).

A common euphemism is  sai1 (west). The phrase  sai1 hau2 sai1 min6 (west mouths and west faces) is often used to describe women who have an impolite look. Some terms that are associated with western culture, such as  sai1 yan4 (westerners), may become Cantonese jokes that are based on the ambiguity of the pronunciations or tones. Other euphemisms include  haai4 (shoes) and  haai5 (crabs). As a result, crabs are sometimes intentionally linked with other words such as stinking and water to achieve some vagina-related humorous effects.

The word hai can also mean total failure, as in the phrase hai1 saai3. The Chinese character , one of whose meanings is similar to the English "bask", functions in Cantonese as the verbal particle for the perfective aspect. To further stress the failure, sometimes the phrase hai1 gau1 saai3 is used (the word gau that means penis is put in between the original phrase). Since this phrase is highly offensive (it consists of two of the five vulgar words), a euphemism or xiehouyu, a kind of Chinese "proverb", is sometimes used. As in a normal xiehouyu, it consists of two elements: the former segment presents a scenario, while the latter provides the rationale thereof. One would often only state the first part, expecting the listener to know the second. The first part is "a man and a woman having a sunbath (naked)". Since the penis and vagina are both exposed to the sun, the second part is hai1 gau1 saai3—a pun for total failure. Therefore, if one wants to say that something is a total failure, he only has to say , and the listener will understand the intended meaning.

Other curse phrases

Puk gaai

Puk gai (more commonly idiomatically written as ) literally means "falling onto street", which is a common curse phrase in Cantonese that may be translated into English as "drop dead". It is sometimes used as a noun to refer to an annoying person that roughly means a "prick". The phrase can also be used in daily life under a variety of situations to express annoyance, disgrace or other emotions. Since the phrase does not involve any sexual organs or reference to sex, some argue that it should not be considered as profanity. Nevertheless, "PK" is often used as a euphemism for the phrase. The written form can be seen on graffiti in Hong Kong and in Guangdong.

In Southeast Asia, the meaning of the phrase has evolved so that it is no longer a profanity, and is usually taken to mean "broke/bankrupt" or "epic fail". In Taiwan, it is commonly used to refer to planking. The term is additionally used in a colloquial sense by Malays in Singapore in which case it is usually rendered as "pokai".

Adding the words  (whole family) in front of a blessing can actually reverse the meaning.

Legal issues
In Hong Kong, there are specific by-laws that forbid the usage of profanity in public. For instance, it is not permitted to "use obscene language... in Ocean Park", for which "an offence is liable on conviction to a fine at level 1 and to imprisonment for 1 month", while in the MTR, it was prohibited to "use any threatening, abusive, obscene or offensive language". However, despite the explicit prohibition by various laws, the exact definition of "obscene language" is not given in the ordinance.

See also

Cantonese slang
Hong Kong Cantonese
Mandarin Chinese profanity

Notes and references

Notes

References

  Part of Chapter 3 concerns Cantonese profanity.

External links
 

 
Cantonese words and phrases
Culture of Hong Kong
Languages of Hong Kong
Profanity